Elena Desderi (born 20 September 1967) is an Italian former cross-country skier. She competed in two events at the 1988 Winter Olympics.

Cross-country skiing results
All results are sourced from the International Ski Federation (FIS).

Olympic Games

World Championships

World Cup

Season standings

References

External links
 

1967 births
Living people
Italian female cross-country skiers
Olympic cross-country skiers of Italy
Cross-country skiers at the 1988 Winter Olympics
People from Demonte
Sportspeople from the Province of Cuneo